Matthieu Laguerre (born 3 February 1999) is a French professional rugby league footballer who plays as a  for the Catalans Dragons in the Super League and France at international level. 

He has previously played for Saint-Esteve in the Elite One Championship.

Background
Laguerre was born in France.

Career
In 2021 he made his Catalans debut in the Super League against Hull Kingston Rovers.

References

External links
Catalans Dragons profile
France profile
French profile

1999 births
Living people
French rugby league players
Rugby league centres
AS Saint Estève players
Catalans Dragons players
France national rugby league team players